Jurong Football Club was a professional football club, based in the Jurong area of Singapore. The club played in S.League, the top division of football in Singapore from 1997 to 2003. The team's best league finishes in this period were fifth place in both 1998 and 2001.

The club was founded in 1975, and prior to 1997 was known as Jurong Town Football Club. The team won Singapore's President's Cup (now known as the Singapore Cup) in 1988 and 1989, and were runners-up in the Singapore Cup in 1999 and 2002.

History

Pre S-League Era 
Jurong Football Club (formerly known as Jurong Town FC) was formed in 1975, the registration date was 25 July 1975. The purpose of forming the club was to serve those thousand employees and residents in the Jurong Industrial estate.

In 1975, the club organised the Jurong League for the men and Jurong Netball League for the ladies. These two competitions attracted a large number of workers in Jurong, after their working hours they used to play in these competitions before going home. Then, the club was given the Division One status. It was coached by the well known footballer of the 1960s, the late Rahim Omar. He coached the club for two years, after which it was relegated to Division Two till 1987.

In 1988, the FAS re-organised the domestic competition, Jurong was once again selected to be in the Premier League. In that year, Jurong was sponsored by Japan Airlines, the first company to come into a domestic competition with $100,000 sponsorship. This sponsorship helped the club to engage players like V. Sundramoorthy, Jeffrey Lazaroo, A.R.J. Mani, K Kannan, D. Tokijan and Lim Chiew Peng. Two youngsters Nazri Nasir and Lim Tong Hai who joined the club at the age of 16. Jurong gave both these young players $3000 scholarship. Jurong also signed Brazilian, Manalton Santos. Jurong won the President's Cup in that year and D. Tokijan was awarded the top scorer for the year. Jurong also signed David Lee at the end of the 1988 season.

In the late 1980s and early 1990s, their kits are sponsored by Hummel.

Sundram did not start the season because he had a good offer from Switzerland. He had this golden opportunity and Jurong do not want to be an obstacle in his career even with one-year contract with Jurong FC, the club happily released him to pursue a better future.

In 1989, David Lee and Au Yeong Pak Kuan joined Jurong FC and the team won the President's Cup, Singapore Pool's Cup and finished runners-up in the Premier League. Jurong FC had two Danish and one Finnish player in the squad.

In 1990, the club gave another opportunity to two youngsters, they are Tamil Maran and Shari Ismail, who are now back with Jurong FC. The club also signed two Australian, Tommy Marras and Peter Murphy. And the team finished second in the Premier League with goal difference to Geylang International.

In 1991, Jurong was relegated to Second Division.

In 1992, Jurong played well and was promoted to Premier League again. During this year another player was unearthed, he was Nahar Daud, now playing for Tiong Bahru United. Jurong FC finished runners-up in the second division and qualify thru the play-off into the Premier League.

In 1993, the club was not doing so well even after signed a Danish coach and three Danish players. But Jurong escaped the relegation.

In 1994, this time no chance, even with players from Slovakia, the club was relegated to Division One.

In 1995, the club was relegated to Division Two.

In 1996, after doing so badly in the past three years, K Suppiah the club manager wanted to help Jurong FC to come back. He engaged Mr Jimmy Pearson to be the coach and M.Somasamy team manager for 1996 team and with two signings from Ghana and one from Nigeria. It worked as Jurong were the group Champion in its group and earned a place in the S-League 1997.

1997–1999: Instability 

1997 saw the former Jurong Town take on their new names Jurong FC and adopt a Scorpion as their mascot. Based in the Bukit Gombak Stadium instead of the original base, Jurong Stadium, Jurong FC finished seventh out of nine teams in their first S-League season. The club's notable achievements that season were ending Geylang United's unbeaten runs in the league and Alan McTurk scoring the fastest goal of the season. .

In 1997, Jurong Reptile Park sponsored the club in a 1 million deal and Jurong FC set up its first clubhouse at Jurong Reptile Park that year. The club also asked its fans to select a new mascot to associate the club with the new sponsor and the winning mascot was a Cobra. Jurong FC was again relocated to the new 2000-seater Jurong East Stadium. This season saw the Cobras finish fifth out of eleven teams. Jurong FC's Scottish coach, Jimmy Pearson, left the club at the end of 1998 season due to some coach-player problems.

Jurong FC topscorer Joseph M Pragasam was the first Jurong FC player to represent Singapore National Team ever since they turned professional. Jurong Reptile Park ended their sponsorship mid-season, leading to grave financial problems for the club. The New Paper  planned and conducted several fund-raising events which brought the club S$500,000. As Jurong Reptile Park were no longer sponsors of Jurong FC, the clubhouse was relocated to Jurong East Stadium that year. Jurong FC was nominated to represent Singapore to participate in the India Shield Tournament in Calcutta in that year.

In 1999, Jurong FC star player, V Sundramoorthy, was appointed the coach of Jurong FC. He became the first ever player-coach  in the S.League history. Jurong finished in sixth position in the 12-team league. That year also saw Jurong FC coming closest to a trophy since their entry into the S.League, as they reached the final of the Singapore Cup. The club's captain, Jason Ainsley, was the top scorer for Jurong FC with 19 goals; he was the third top scorer overall for that season. Jurong FC's main sponsor WSA Lines then ended their sponsorship as well. Dalis Supait was recalled back to the national team after a superb performance that season.

2003: Pulling out from the S-League 

Finally in 2003, Jurong FC's financial problems forced the club to pull out from the S-League indefinitely much to the dismay of its fans and supporters.

Seasons 

 2003 saw the introduction of penalty shoot-outs if a match ended in a draw in regular time. Winners of penalty shoot-outs gained two points instead of one.

Cup wins 
 President's Cup: 1988, 1989

References

External links 
 Official club website
 S.League website page on Jurong FC

 
Football clubs in Singapore
Association football clubs established in 1975
1975 establishments in Singapore
Singapore Premier League clubs
Association football clubs disestablished in 2003